Allobates ranoides is a species of frog in the family Aromobatidae.
It is endemic to Colombia.
Its natural habitats are tropical moist lowland forest and rivers.
It is threatened by habitat loss.

References

ranoides
Amphibians of Colombia
Endemic fauna of Colombia
Taxonomy articles created by Polbot
Amphibians described in 1918